Stemonitopsis is a genus of slime molds in the family Amaurochaetaceae. First circumscribed by Norwegian botanist Elly Nannenga-Bremekamp in 1967 as a subgenus of Comatricha, she later elevated the grouping to generic status in 1975. The type species is Stemonitopsis hyperopta, which was originally described by Charles Meylan in 1919 as Stemonitis hyperopta.

Species
, there are 10 species in the genus.

Stemonitopsis aequalis
Stemonitopsis amoena
Stemonitopsis curiosa
Stemonitopsis gracilis
Stemonitopsis hyperopta
Stemonitopsis microspora
Stemonitopsis peritricha
Stemonitopsis reticulata
Stemonitopsis subcaespitosa
Stemonitopsis typhina

References

Myxogastria
Amoebozoa genera